Árnafjall is the highest mountain on the island of Vágar in the Faroe Islands. The name Árnafjall translates to the eagles mountain. The mountain lies on the west side of Vágar close to the village of Gásadalur.

References 

Vágar
Mountains of the Faroe Islands